Gorybia is a genus of beetles in the family Cerambycidae, containing the species:

 Gorybia acuta Martins, 1976
 Gorybia adiaphora Martins, 1976
 Gorybia alboapex Martins, 1976
 Gorybia amazonensis Martins & Galileo, 2010
 Gorybia apatheia Martins, 1976
 Gorybia armata Martins, 1976
 Gorybia bahiensis Galileo & Martins, 2010
 Gorybia bispinosa Martins, Galileo & de-Oliveira, 2009
 Gorybia calcitrapa Martins, 1976
 Gorybia castanea (Gounelle, 1909)
 Gorybia chontalensis (Bates, 1880)
 Gorybia echinata Martins, 1976
 Gorybia hirsutella Martins, 1976
 Gorybia instita Martins, 1976
 Gorybia invicta Martins, 1976
 Gorybia lissonota Martins, 1976
 Gorybia maculosa Martins, 1976
 Gorybia martes Pascoe, 1866
 Gorybia minima Martins, 1976
 Gorybia montana Martins & Galileo, 2007
 Gorybia orygma Martins, 1976
 Gorybia pallida Martins, 1976
 Gorybia palpalis Martins, 1976
 Gorybia picturata Martins, 1976
 Gorybia pilosa Martins, 1976
 Gorybia procera Martins, 1976
 Gorybia proxima Martins, 1976
 Gorybia pusilla (Bates, 1870)
 Gorybia quadrispinosa Galileo & Martins, 2008
 Gorybia reclusa Martins, 1976
 Gorybia rondonia Galileo & Martins, 2010
 Gorybia ruficauda (Gounelle, 1909)
 Gorybia rugosa Martins, 1976
 Gorybia semiopaca Martins, 1976
 Gorybia senticosa Martins, 1976
 Gorybia separata Martins, 1976
 Gorybia simplicior (Bates, 1870)
 Gorybia stomias Martins, 1976
 Gorybia sulcata Martins & Galileo, 2010
 Gorybia suturella Martins, 1976
 Gorybia thoracica Martins, 1976
 Gorybia tibialis Martins, 1976
 Gorybia umbella Martins, 1976
 Gorybia veneficella Martins, 1976
 Gorybia zonula Martins, 1976

References

Piezocerini